Euproctis flavinata is a moth of the family Erebidae first described by Francis Walker in 1865. It is found in China and Hong Kong.

The caterpillar feeds on Camellia oleifera.

References

Moths of Asia
Moths described in 1865